Bruce David Janu (born 12 July 1968) is an educator and low budget Illinois filmmaker. He teaches social studies at Elk Grove High School in Elk Grove Village, Illinois. Janu also makes educational materials and films. In 2000, he created an educational supply company called Bell, Book & Camera Productions. Through this company, he wrote and published several educational books, including Bring Out Your Dead: Recreating the Black Death in the Classroom; Mouldering in the Grave: A Dramatic Approach to Teaching About John Brown; and The Constitution: A Cooperative Learning Approach. He has also written several articles for Illinois History Teacher.

Films
Janu began creating educational films for his classroom use. The films have covered a wide variety of subjects, including immigration, freedom, millennium fears, and gothic cathedrals. The short films usually involve Janu dressing in strange costumes and talking with people on the streets of Chicago.

Janu moved Bell, Book & Camera Productions into the wedding videography field in 2001.

In 2005, he began work on his first feature-length film:  a documentary entitled Facing Sudan. Janu got the idea for the film after meeting Brian Burns, a young janitor at Hersey High School who had been to South Sudan. Burns told him stories about children dying in his arms and villagers running for cover at the sound of a distant plane.  When Janu decided to document Burns's story for a classroom video, he met other people with experiences in South Sudan. Soon, Janu had enough material that he converted the planned short into a feature-length documentary.

Facing Sudan was completed in early 2007 and features a soundtrack composed by Tom Flannery and Lorne Clarke. It earned earned two Best Documentary Awards on the 2007 film festival circuit. 

In 2008, Janu completed Crayons and Paper. This film tells the story of Dr. Jerry Ehrlich, a pediatrician who has traveled to war-torn areas, giving his young patients crayons and paper to document their lives.  The 30-minute film features drawings from children in Sri Lanka and Darfur.

In addition to his documentary and educational works, Janu occasionally produces corporate video and has even directed two music videos. He is completing his first novel, Lilac Wine, and hosts an internet radio station, The Vinyl Voyage.

Frank Sinatra Detention Club 

Janu is an avid Frank Sinatra fan. He routinely places Sinatra extra credit questions on tests and even has Frank Sinatra homework tokens. 

When Janu started teaching in the early 1990s, he gained short-lived notoriety for creating the "Frank Sinatra Detention Club.” He used Sinatra's music as a form of detention punishment by singing along to Sinatra songs played loudly for a half hour. 

After the Chicago Sun-Times did a front page article about the detention club, the story was picked up by news wires and made it into newspapers and magazines across the country, including Time, USA Today, and Life.  In December, 1992, Esquire awarded Janu a Dubious Achievement Award for the club.

Personal life
He lives in Cary, Illinois, with his wife, Cheryl and sons, Brennan and Quinn.

References

External links
 Bell, Book & Camera Productions
 Facing Sudan Official Site
 Crayons and Paper trailer, featured on GRITtv with Laura Flanders
  Lilac Wine: A Novel
 Vinyl Voyage Radio Station
 John Hersey High School

American documentary filmmakers
People from Arlington Heights, Illinois
Living people
1968 births
Film directors from Illinois
Educators from Illinois